Natalia Christine Poluakan (born 19 December 1985) is an Indonesian retired badminton player. She won Vietnam Open tournament with her partners Yulianti in 2007, and a bronze medal at the 2005 Asian Badminton Championships in Hyderabad, India with Lita Nurlita.

Achievements

Asian Championships 
Women's doubles

BWF Grand Prix 
The BWF Grand Prix had two levels, the Grand Prix and Grand Prix Gold. It was a series of badminton tournaments sanctioned by the Badminton World Federation (BWF) and played between 2007 and 2017.

Women's doubles

  BWF Grand Prix Gold tournament
  BWF Grand Prix tournament

International Challenge/Series 
Mixed doubles

  BWF International Challenge tournament
  BWF International Series tournament

References

External links 
 Portal Bulutangkis Indonesia

1985 births
Living people
People from Minahasa Regency
Sportspeople from North Sulawesi
Minahasa people
Indonesian female badminton players
Competitors at the 2005 Southeast Asian Games
Southeast Asian Games bronze medalists for Indonesia
Southeast Asian Games medalists in badminton
20th-century Indonesian women
21st-century Indonesian women